Oregon v. Elstad, 470 U.S. 298 (1985), was a landmark Supreme Court of the United States case relating to Miranda warnings.

Background
A house in the town of Salem, Polk County (most of Salem is located in Marion County), Oregon was burglarized. A witness to the burglary contacted the local sheriff's office and implicated an 18 year old neighbor, Michael Elstad. Two officers went to Elstad's home with a warrant for his arrest. When the police entered the house and asked Elstad about the burglary he admitted to the burglary. The officers then escorted Elstad to the sheriff's headquarters. About an hour later, the same officers began interrogating Elstad by reading him his Miranda rights for the first time. During this interrogation, the officers obtained a written admission of Elstad's involvement in the burglary. Subsequently, Elstad was convicted of burglary and sentenced to 5 years and $18,000 in restitution.

Case 
The issue presented was whether the self-incrimination clause of the 5th Amendment requires suppression of a confession made after Miranda warnings and a waiver, because police obtained an earlier admission without Miranda warnings.

Justice O'Connor, writing for the majority, held that, while the pre-Miranda statements must be suppressed, the statements made after Miranda do not need to be suppressed as long as the statements were made knowingly and voluntarily.

Subsequent Developments
In Missouri v. Seibert the police practice was to obtain a confession from suspects, then Mirandize the suspects and obtain a "valid" confession. Missouri developed this practice as a result of the holding in Oregon v. Elstad. The Supreme Court condemned this practice and suppressed the statements.

Further reading

References

External links
 

United States Supreme Court cases
United States Supreme Court cases of the Burger Court
1985 in United States case law
United States Fifth Amendment self-incrimination case law